The Four Day War may refer to:

The Ecuadorian Civil War of 1932
The Libyan–Egyptian War in 1977
The 2016 Nagorno-Karabakh conflict

See also
Four Days' Battle
Four Days of Naples